Maurice Russell "Mort" Brown (November 11, 1912 – June 24, 2008) was a Canadian mining journalist.

Early life and education 
Born in Port Arthur, now Thunder Bay, Ontario, he graduated in 1938 from the University of Toronto with a B.Sc. in mining engineering.

Career 
Brown worked as a mining instructor at the Lakehead Technical Institute from 1947 to 1949. In 1949, he joined the staff of The Northern Miner, Canada's most important mining journal He became editor in 1977 and publisher in 1985, retiring in 1992.  

Brown was inducted into the Canadian Mining Hall of Fame in 1993.

References

1912 births
2008 deaths
University of Toronto alumni
Journalists from Ontario
Writers from Thunder Bay
Canadian mining engineers